= Nadezhda Finogenova =

Soviet and Russian theatre and circus scholar

- Надежда Тимофеевна Финогенова
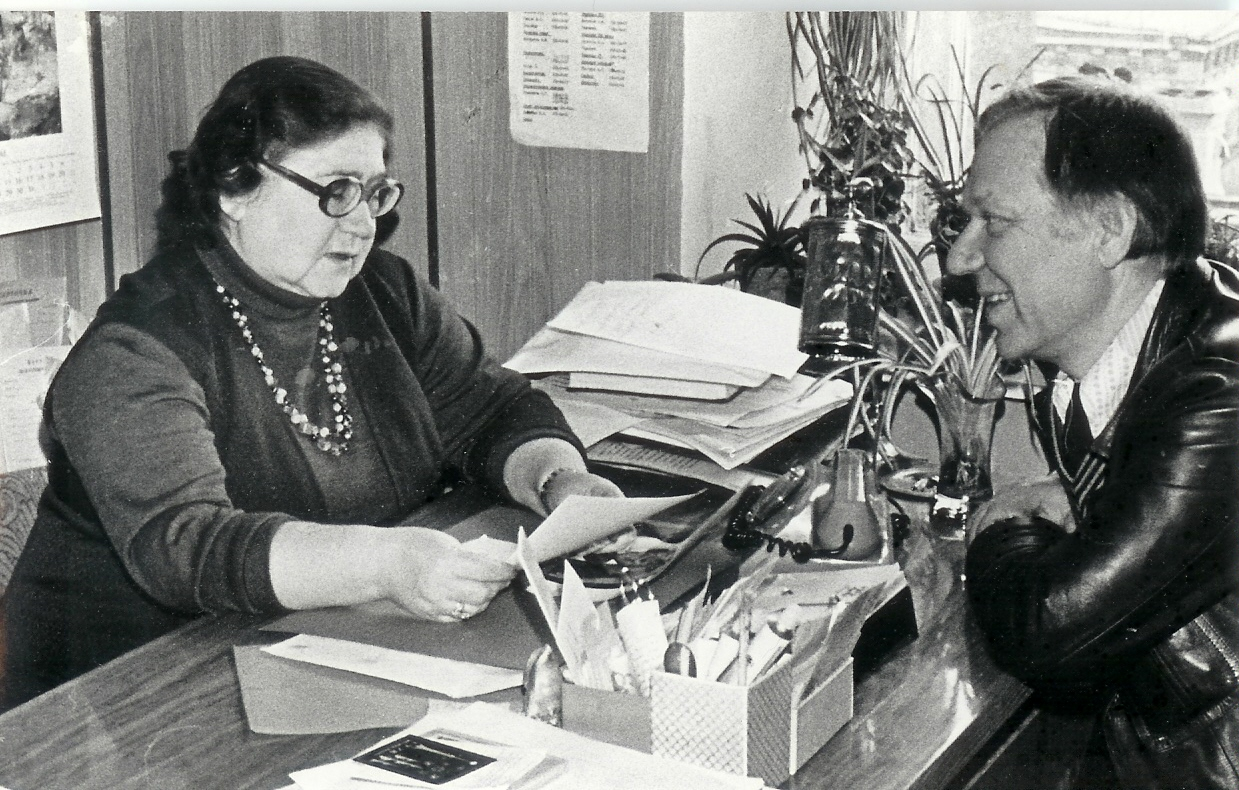
- Finogenova with Oleg Popov in 1975
- Born: 19 March 1926; Khartsyzk, Ukrainian SSR, Soviet Union
- Died: 10 October 2012 (aged 86)
- Education: Russian Institute of Theatre Arts
- Occupations: Theatre scholar, circus scholar, editor
- Spouse: Yuri Nekhoroshev
- Children: Alexander Nekhoroshev

Nadezhda Timofeevna Finogenova (Russian: Надежда Тимофеевна Финогенова; 19 March 1926 – 10 October 2012) was a Soviet and Russian theatre scholar, circus scholar and book editor. She worked on publications devoted to theatre, circus, variety art and other genres of the performing arts.

== Early life and education ==
Finogenova was born on 19 March 1926 in Khartsyzk, then in the Ukrainian SSR of the Soviet Union. She studied at the theatre studies faculty of the State Institute of Theatre Arts in Moscow, known as GITIS. The institute's list of theatre studies graduates includes Nadezhda Timofeevna Finogenova among the 1953 graduates.

== Career ==
Finogenova worked as an editor of books on theatre, circus and variety art. She was connected with the Moscow publishing house Iskusstvo, which issued many books on the performing arts during the Soviet period.

Her editorial work included publications on circus history and performance. She is credited as editor of Alexander Vadimov and Mark Trivas's book From Ancient Magicians to Illusionists of Our Days, published by Iskusstvo in 1966. She was also credited as editor of Rudolf Slavsky's Vitaly Lazarenko, a book in the Soviet series Life in Art.

In the 1979 edition of Circus: A Little Encyclopedia, compiled by A. Ya. Shneer and R. E. Slavsky and edited by Yu. A. Dmitriev, Finogenova was given a separate biographical entry. The encyclopedia described her as an editor and noted her role in preparing books on circus art for publication.

== Writing and memoirs ==
Finogenova also wrote on theatre and circus figures. Together with Yuri Nekhoroshev, she contributed the memoir essay "Продолжение следует" ("To be continued") to the collection Театр. Цирк. Эстрада. Глазами влюбленного ("Theatre, Circus, Variety Art: Through the Eyes of an Enthusiast"), a volume dedicated to Yuri Dmitriev.

== Selected editorial work ==
- Alexander Vadimov and Mark Trivas, From Ancient Magicians to Illusionists of Our Days (1966).
- Rudolf Slavsky, Vitaly Lazarenko (1980).
- Books on circus, theatre and variety art published by Iskusstvo.
